CBGA-FM is a French-language Canadian radio station located in Matane, Quebec.

Owned and operated by Société Radio-Canada, it broadcasts on 102.1 MHz with an effective radiated power of 42,930 watts (class C1) using an omnidirectional antenna.

The station has a non-commercial news/talk format and is part of the Ici Radio-Canada Première network, which operates across Canada. Like all other Première stations, but unlike most FM stations, CBGA-FM broadcasts in mono.

Previously known as CBGA when the station was on 1250 kHz, the station moved to 102.1 FM in 2004. The station was founded in 1948 as CKBL and changed its call sign when it was bought by Radio-Canada in 1972.

The station's current local programs are Bon pied, bonne heure !, in the mornings from 6 a.m. to 9 a.m., and Au coeur du monde in the afternoons, 3:30 p.m. to 6 p.m. CBGA-FM also co-produces D'Est en est, a pan-regional program produced in turn with CJBR-FM Rimouski and CBSI-FM Sept-Îles and heard afternoons during the summer months. On public holidays, its local programs are replaced with local shows airing provincewide (Quebec) produced by different outlets in turn (except Montreal and Quebec City). Its Saturday morning program, Samedi et rien d'autre, originates from CBF-FM Montreal.

Rebroadcasters

On August 30, 2011, the CBC has applied to close AM station CBGA-1, a 10,000 watt Class B repeater in Grande-Anse, New Brunswick, to be replaced with FM transmitters in Chandler, New Richmond, New Carlisle, Percé and Port-Daniel–Gascons. These transmitters were approved by the CRTC on October 28, 2011. The AM station mainly served listeners on the Quebec side of Chaleur Bay; listeners in the Bathurst area already receive Première programming from CBAF-FM-2 105.7 in Allardville, a repeater of CBAF-FM Moncton.

On January 4, 2013, the CBC filed an application to convert CBGA-6 1270 to 97.7 MHz. This application was approved by the CRTC on April 11, 2013.

During 2014, additional transmitters were applied for, and approved, in Escuminac and Matapédia.

CBGA-1 left the air in early December 2014, after the aforementioned FM rebroadcasters on the Quebec side of Chaleur Bay were activated.

References

External links
 Ici Radio-Canada Première 
 

Bga
Bga
Bga
Matane
Radio stations established in 1948
1948 establishments in Quebec